Linwood E. Palmer Jr. (November 22, 1921 – July 24, 2008) was an American politician from Maine. A Republican from Nobleboro, he served six terms (12 years) in the Maine Legislature, including 10 in the Maine House of Representatives (1946–50 and 1972–78) and two in the Maine Senate (1951–52).

During Palmer's last two terms in the Legislature (1974–78), he served as House Minority Leader. In 1978, Palmer won the Republican nomination for governor, but lost the general election to Democratic State Senator Joseph E. Brennan of Portland.

Palmer attended Colby College, Andover Newton Theological School and the University of Maine.

References

1921 births
2008 deaths
People from Nobleboro, Maine
Minority leaders of the Maine House of Representatives
Republican Party Maine state senators
Colby College alumni
Andover Newton Theological School alumni
University of Maine alumni
20th-century American politicians